Aleksandra Krunić was the defending champion, but lost in the first round to Amra Sadiković.

Ivana Jorović won the title, defeating Çağla Büyükakçay in the final, 7–6(7–3), 3–6, 6–2.

Seeds

Main draw

Finals

Top half

Bottom half

References 
 Main draw

2010s in Ankara
2015 in Turkish tennis
Ankara Cup - Singles
Ankara Cup